Camila Ribeiro da Silva (born 12 April 1975), known professionally as Camila Morgado, is a Brazilian actress.

Career
The daughter of a merchant and a stay-at-home mother, she decided she wanted to be an actress at an early age. She moved to São Paulo to study theater with Antunes Filho. In 2003, she landed a role in A Casa das Sete Mulheres, playing Manuela de Paula Ferreira and revealing itself to a vast television audience.

In 2004, Morgado played the title character in the film Olga, with a screenplay based on the book by Fernando Morais. That same year, she appeared in the miniseries Um Só Coração as Cacilda Becker. She played Ana Rosemberg, a lesbian journalist, in the miniseries JK. and auditioned for the role of "May" in the soap opera América (2005).

Morgado presented the programme Faixa Comentada on Futura. In 2008, she appeared in the musical comedy Doce Deleite, directed by Marília Pêra. The following year, she appeared in Viver a Vida, by Manoel Carlos.

In 2011, Morgado appeared in the stage play Igual a Você, along with Bia Nunnes and Anderson Müller. In 2012, she was part of the ensemble series As Brasileiras. She currently is part of the cast of Avenida Brasil, playing the role of Noêmia. In 2013, she had a cameo role in A Grande Família as "Cris".

In 2014, Morgado plays Sara Xerxes, a woman in a dreary routine who finds a new meaning for her life: to take revenge on all her ex-boyfriends, in the series Multishow, Por Isso Eu Sou Vingativa. In the same year, she plays the single rich party girl, Maria Angélica, in the remake of O Rebu.

Filmography

Television

Film

Theater

References

External links

1975 births
Living people
Actresses from Petrópolis
Brazilian television actresses
Brazilian film actresses
Brazilian stage actresses